Bakke Church may refer to:

Bakke Church (Agder), a church in Flekkefjord municipality in Agder county, Norway
Bakke Church (Trondheim), a church in Trondheim municipality in Trøndelag county, Norway
Bakke Church (Viken), a church in Øvre Eiker municipality in Viken county, Norway